Singampalle is a village in Rajavommangi Mandal, Alluri Sitharama Raju district in the state of Andhra Pradesh in India.

Geography 

Demographics 
 India census, Singampalle had a population of 747, out of which 239 were male and 508 were female. The population of children below 6 years of age was 6%. The literacy rate of the village was 59%.

References 

Villages in Rajavommangi mandal